George Edmund Dearing (30 December 1911 – 23 February 1968) was a British trade union leader.

Dearing came to prominence in 1945 as the Leicester District Secretary of the newly formed National Union of Hosiery and Knitwear Workers (NUHKW).  In 1958, he was appointed as the union's Assistant General Secretary, then in 1960 became its General Secretary.  In 1963, he was elected as General President, the most senior post in the union.

Dearing also represented his union on the management committee of the General Federation of Trade Unions, and the executive committee of the International Textile and Garment Workers' Federation.

In his spare time, Dearing chaired the East Midlands Economic Planning Council from 1965, and also served on the Consultative Council of the East Midlands Gas Board.  He was active in the Labour Party, and was an Urban District Councillor until he stood down in 1967.

Dearing received a number of accolades; he was made a Member of the Order of the British Empire in 1950, and a Commander in 1966, and was given an honorary master's degree by the University of Leicester in 1967.

Dearing died suddenly in February 1968, while at a union meeting in Nottingham.

References

1911 births
1968 deaths
Labour Party (UK) councillors
British trade union leaders